Ramon Zomer (born 13 April 1983) is a Dutch former professional footballer who played as a centre back. Zomer played for Twente, NEC, SC Heerenveen, Heracles Almelo and the Netherlands national under-21 football team.

Career
Zomer is a product of Twente's youth system, making his league debut during the 2002–03 season. He was a member of the Dutch squad that won the UEFA U-21 Championship in 2006. He joined NEC on loan in the 2008–09 season, and permanently in the summer of 2009. He served as a captain of the club during the 2010–11 season.

On 19 August 2011, Zomer signed a three-year contract with SC Heerenveen. After he lost his place in the first eleven, he left the club on a free transfer. He signed a one-year deal with Heracles Almelo on 27 June 2014.

Zomer retired on 1 November 2016.

References

External links
 Voetbal International profile 

Living people
1983 births
Sportspeople from Almelo
Association football defenders
Dutch footballers
Netherlands under-21 international footballers
FC Twente players
NEC Nijmegen players
SC Heerenveen players
Heracles Almelo players
Eredivisie players
Footballers from Overijssel